Aenictus hilli is a species of light brown army ant found in Australia, the only specimen having been one collected in Malanda, Queensland.

References

Dorylinae
Hymenoptera of Australia
Insects described in 1928